Samuel Timothy Clemmett (born 1 October 1993) is a British actor. He is best known for his role as Albus Potter in the play Harry Potter and the Cursed Child.

Early life
Clemmett is from Brundall near Norwich. He attended Thorpe St Andrew School. He began acting as a hobby when he was a child, and later taking part in an intensive at the National Youth Theatre at 16.

Career
Clemmett's first audition was for Lord of the Flies, going on to make his professional acting debut as Bill in the 2011 production of Nigel Williams' stage adaptation at Regent's Park Open Air Theatre. He made his television debut in 2013 with guest appearances in Foyle's War on ITV and Doctors on BBC One. Clemmett went on to play Ernst in Nivelli's War at the MAC in Belfast and Ian Trenting in Accolade at St James Theatre in London in 2014, and then Mark in WINK at Theatre503 and Tom in the Royal Shakespeare Company production of Wendy & Peter Pan in 2015. He appeared in an episode of the BBC period drama The Musketeers.

In 2016, it was announced Clemmett would star in the play Harry Potter and the Cursed Child, originating the role of Albus Severus Potter in the West End production at the Palace Theatre. He continued his role in the Broadway run of the play at the Lyric Theatre in 2018.

Clemmett starred as Charlie MacDonald in the 2021 World War I film The War Below. He also appeared in the crime film Cherry that year. He has an upcoming role as young Brimsley in the Netflix prequel Queen Charlotte: A Bridgerton Story.

Personal life
Clemmett married Danarose Lobue in October 2022. He is a patron of MoCo Theatre Company at the Norwich Theatre Royal.

Filmography

Stage

References

External links
 
 Sam Clemmett at Insight Management
 
 Sam Clemmett on the Harry Potter and the Cursed Child website

Living people
1993 births
21st-century English male actors
Actors from Norfolk
English male child actors
English male film actors
English male television actors
National Youth Theatre members
People from Brundall